Ondrašová is a village and municipality in Turčianske Teplice District in the Žilina Region of northern central Slovakia.

History
In historical records the village was first mentioned in 1252.

Geography
The municipality lies at an altitude of 470 metres and covers an area of 6.982 km². It has a population of about 53 people.

External links
http://www.statistics.sk/mosmis/eng/run.html

Villages and municipalities in Turčianske Teplice District